Donald Eugene Gillis (June 17, 1912 – January 10, 1978) was an American composer, conductor, teacher, and radio producer.  The composition which has gained him most recognition is his orchestral Symphony No. 5½, A Symphony for Fun.

Biography
Gillis was born in Cameron, Missouri.  His family moved to Fort Worth, Texas, and he studied at Texas Christian University, playing trombone and acting as assistant director of the university band.  He graduated in 1935, and obtained a master's degree from North Texas State University in 1943.

He became production director for the radio station WBAP, later moving to NBC where he became producer for the NBC Symphony Orchestra during the tenure of its conductor Arturo Toscanini.  He held several teaching posts at academic institutions in the southern United States during his career, and also helped to found the Symphony of the Air orchestra. Gillis produced several NBC radio programs, including Serenade to America and NBC Concert Hour. After Toscanini retired in 1954, Gillis, serving as president of the Symphony Foundation of America, was instrumental in helping to form the Symphony of the Air, using members of the old NBC Symphony. Gillis also produced the radio program Toscanini: The Man Behind the Legend, which ran for several years on NBC after the Italian conductor's death.

In 1973 he joined the faculty of the University of South Carolina where he founded, and was chairman of, the Institute for Media Arts and was instrumental in establishing the Instructional Services Center. Dr. Gillis also served as USC's composer-in-residence until his death.

He died in Columbia, South Carolina, on January 10, 1978. His papers and an extensive collection of recorded material are housed at the University of North Texas in Denton.

Music
Despite his administrative responsibilities, Gillis was a prolific composer, writing ten orchestral symphonies, tone poems like Portrait of a Frontier Town, piano concertos, rhapsodies for harp and orchestra, and six string quartets.  He also composed a wide variety of band music. Gillis is best remembered  as the composer of his Symphony No. 5½, A Symphony for Fun, originally performed by Arturo Toscanini and the NBC Symphony Orchestra during a September 21, 1947, broadcast concert that Gillis also produced; it was preserved on transcription discs but not commercially issued. Since 2005, his symphonies have been recorded on the Albany Records label.

Gillis sought to interpret contemporary American culture musically. His music drew upon popular material, particularly emphasizing jazz, which he considered a revitalizing element in American music. He assimilated popular influences in a simple and straightforward style aimed at communicating with his audiences through an emphasis on clear, accessible, melodic writing. Many of his works are best characterized as fun and full of humor.

Chronological list of principal compositions

1936 String Quartet 1
1937 The Panhandle, symphonic suite for orchestra
1937 The Crucifixion, cantata
1937 The Woolyworm, for orchestra
1937 Thoughts Provoked on Becoming a Prospective Papa, symphonic suite
1937 The Raven, after Edgar Allan Poe, for narrator and orchestra
1938 Suite 1 for Wind Quintet
1939 Suite 2 for Wind Quintet
1939 Suite 3 for Wind Quintet
1939–40 Symphony 1, An American Symphony
1940 Intermission – Ten Minutes, symphonic sketch for orchestra
1940 Portrait of a Frontier Town, for orchestra
1940 Symphony 2, Symphony of Faith
1940–41 Symphony 3, A Symphony for Free Men
1941 The Night Before Christmas, for narrator and orchestra
1942 Three Sketches, for strings
1943 Prairie Poem, tone poem
1943 Symphony 4, The Pioneers

1944 The Alamo, tone poem
1944 A Short Overture to an Unwritten Opera, for orchestra
1944–45 Symphony 5, In Memoriam
1945 To An Unknown Soldier, tone poem
1945 This Is Our America, cantata
1945–46 Symphony 5½, A Symphony for Fun
1946 Rhapsody for harp and orchestra
1947 Dude Ranch, tone poem
1947 String Quartet 6
1947 Symphony 6, Mid-Century USA
1948 Symphony 7, Saga of the Prairie School
1949 Shindig, ballet in 7 episodes for orchestra
1950 Symphony 8, A Dance Symphony
1950 Tulsa, a symphonic portrait in oil, for orchestra
1951 Symphony 9, Star-Spangled Symphony

1954 The Coming of The King, for chorus
1956 Piano Concerto 1, Encore Concerto
1956 Pep-Rally, opera for band
1957 The Park Avenue Kids, opera
1957 Five Acre Pond, for oboe and orchestra
1958 The Libretto, opera
1958 Men of Music, for band
1959 The Land of Wheat, suite for band
1961–62 The Legend of Star Valley Junction, opera
1964 Ceremony of Allegiance, for narrator and band
1965 Seven Golden Texts, for narrator voices and orchestra
1966 The Gift of the Magi, opera
1966 World Premiere, opera
1966 Piano Concerto 2
1967 Arturo Toscanini, A Portrait of a Century, for narrator and orchestra
1967 Symphony X (n°10), Big D(allas)
1967-8 The Nazarene, opera
1969 Rhapsody for trumpet and orchestra
1973 Behold the Man, opera
1976 The Secret History of the Birth of a Nation, for narrator voices and orchestra

Publications
 The Unfinished Symphony Conductor.  Pemberton Press (1967).  A satirical conducting manual.
 The Art of Media Instruction.  Crescendo Book Publications (1973).

Memberships and affiliations 
 Phi Mu Alpha Sinfonia
 Alpha Alpha, 1958 (National Honorary Chapter)
 Gamma Theta, 1941 (University of North Texas College of Music Chapter)

External links
 
 DonGillisMusic a website maintained by Gillis' daughter.
 Don Gillis Collection at the University of North Texas
 Humoresque Short item in Time magazine on Gillis' Symphony 5½, A Symphony for Fun (1947)
 The Man Who Invented Music Short item in Time on Gillis' "The Man Who Invented Music" (1949)
 Don Gillis Short article about Gillis from the Compact Discoveries program on the Public Broadcasting Service

1912 births
1978 deaths
American opera composers
Male opera composers
Ballet composers
University of North Texas College of Music alumni
People from Fort Worth, Texas
Phi Mu Alpha Sinfonia
People from Cameron, Missouri
University of South Carolina faculty
American radio producers
20th-century American composers
American male classical composers
American classical composers
20th-century classical composers
Classical musicians from Texas
Classical musicians from Missouri
20th-century American male musicians